Delwende is a 2005 Burkinabé drama film directed by S. Pierre Yameogo about a mother and daughter resisting to succumb to a local sexist tradition. It was screened in the Un Certain Regard section at the 2005 Cannes Film Festival where it won the Prize of Hope award.

Plot
After a young boy dies of meningitis, Napoko Diarrha (Yaméogo) is accused of eating his soul because of a local sexist tradition.

While this happens, her husband feels disgraced that Diarrha resists the idea of marrying off their daughter, so he exacts his revenge by spreading a dangerous rumor that would probably get her killed. Because of this, Diarrha's fate falls into the village elder's hands. When she finds out she will go trial, she decides to flee to the nearest town, Ouagadougou, before that  can take place.

After successfully leaving her village, Diarrha's age causes her health to decline, while her daughter grows up.

Some time later, her daughter decides to travel to Ouagadougou, in search of her missing mother. Once they are reconnected, they attempt to escape from their male-dominated society.

Cast
 Blandine Yaméogo as Napoko
 Claire Ilboudo as Pougbila
 Célestin Zongo as Diahrra
 Abdoulaye Komboudri as Nonceur
 Daniel Kabore as Bancé, l'ancien
 Jules Taonssa as Raogo, le devin
 Thomas Ngourma as Elie, le fou

References

External links

2005 films
2005 drama films
More-language films
Films directed by S. Pierre Yameogo
Burkinabé drama films
French drama films
2000s French films